Rotes Luch (literally "Red Glade")
It is located in the southwestern corner of the nature reserve Märkische Schweiz of Brandenburg, Germany.

Geography 
The Red Glade is the highest part of the glacial trough building a passage between the Berlin glacial valley at Erkner and the Oder river valley respectively the Eberswalde glacial valley near Neutrebbin. This depression, also known as Buckow Groove, separates the northwestern plateau of the Barnim (de) from the southeastern upland area of the Land Lebus.
The high embankment of the Eastern Railway crosses the area from west to east. The headwaters of the small stream Stobber are located here. Due to the drainage divide between Baltic Sea and North Sea that runs along the railway embankment, there is the peculiar situation that the stream flows in two different directions. This phenomenon is called "pseudo-bifurcation".

Flora and fauna 
 Dry, frequently open grasslands on calciferous sand
 Semi-natural dry grasslands and scrubland facies on calcareous substrates (Festuco-Brometalia)
 Alkaline fens
 Sub-Atlantic and medio-European oak or oak-hornbeam forests of the Carpinion betuli (de)
 Alluvial forests with black alder (Alnus glutinosa) and European ash (Fraxinus excelsior).
Important orchid sites are reported on dry grassland, and marsh marigold (Caltha palustris) on wetland.

The Natura 2000 report mentioned fishes as there are the spined loach (Cobitis taenia), the European weather loach (Misgurnus fossilis) and the European bitterling (Rhodeus sericeus amarus). Observed mammals are the European beaver (Castor fiber) and the European otter (Lutra lutra).

Human interference 

Since the early 20th century large areas of the landscape had been used as a landfill, mostly with rubbish from Berlin transported on the route of the Eastern Railway. With the proclamation of the Märkische Schweiz Nature Park in 1990 a new phase of land use began where the compatibility between nature and human use should be significantly improved.

From 1956 to 1993 the Nachrichtenregiment 14 of the NPA Air Force was stationed in the Red Glade.

Activities
The upper part of Rotes Luch is touched by the E11 European long distance path. The section of this hiking trail that comes from Buckow follows the north-western edge of the glade to the railway line before it turns west toward Strausberg.

Notes and references

External links 

Wetlands of Germany
Bogs of Brandenburg